Home and Away is an Australian television soap opera. It was first broadcast on the Seven Network on 17 January 1988. The following is a list of characters that appeared in 2022, by order of first appearance. All characters are introduced by the soap's executive producer, Lucy Addario. The 35th season of Home and Away began airing from 31 January 2022. Xander Delaney was introduced at the end of March, followed shortly after by his sibling Rose Delaney in early April and PK at the end of the month. Lyrik band members Bob Forsyth, Kirby Aramoana, Remi Carter, and Eden Fowler made their debuts in July. Bree Cameron and Heather Frazer arrived in August.

Xander Delaney

Xander Delaney, played by Luke Van Os, made his first appearance on 31 March 2022. The casting and character details were announced on 21 October 2021. Van Os is the cousin of former Home and Away actor Chris Hemsworth (Kim Hyde). He sought advice from Hemsworth ahead of a callback for the show, explaining "When I was asked for a callback for the chemistry test, I actually zoomed with Chris the night before and we ran it (the scene) and kind of just got into a good headspace." After winning the role, Van Os relocated to Sydney to be closer to the studios and began filming the same week as his casting announcement. Xander is Van Os's breakthrough role, and he hoped the part would help him to go on to have a long career, like many of the show's former actors. Van Os later teased a connection between Xander and an established character. 

Xander was also billed as "a mysterious individual who arrives in the Bay searching for answers". It was later confirmed that Xander is related to Jasmine Delaney (Sam Frost) and fellow newcomer Rose Delaney (Kirsty Marillier). Xander and Rose were not aware of Jasmine until their father died. Van Os explained "Upon the will reading, Xander finds a name he doesn't recognise, Jasmine Delaney. Xander comes to the Bay to figure out who this mystery woman is and at the very least give her the money his father left in the will for her." Jasmine initially refuses to get to know Xander and Rose, believing they are scam artists. She asks her partner Cash Newman (Nicholas Cartwright) to run a background check on the pair, which causes a "disappointed" Xander to suggest that he and Rose leave the Bay.

Rose Delaney

Rose Delaney, played by Kirsty Marillier, made her first appearance on 4 April 2022. Marillier's casting and character details were announced on 15 November 2021. Jonathan Moran from The Daily Telegraph reported that she had already filmed her first scenes and had five weeks of filming completed. Marillier previously made a guest appearance in the serial in 2018 as Rhea. She will join the main cast this around, and she stated: "It is pretty life changing, I am not going to lie. It is really like that big break you crave and wish for as a student and young actor. It really is the break that I always wanted to be a series regular on a show like this, which is so iconic as a part of the Australian canon, and to be acting every day, exercising that muscle, learning on set from everyone around me, it truly is like something I feel so humbled to have been offered." 

Further details about Rose's introduction confirmed that she is related to Jasmine Delaney (Sam Frost) and fellow newcomer Xander Delaney (Luke Van Os). On-screen it is established that Rose and Jasmine are not biologically related, as she and Xander share the same mother, but have different fathers. Rose and Xander come to Summer Bay to honour their father's will and give Jasmine her share of the inheritance. While Rose wants to get it over with, Xander is keen to get to know Jasmine. Rose is a police officer, who develops a crush on her colleague and Jasmine's boyfriend Cash Newman (Nicholas Cartwright). Cash convinces Rose to stay and not abandon Jasmine like their father did. She eventually joins the local police department and works alongside Cash.

PK

Peter "PK" King, played by Ryan Johnson, made his first appearance on 28 April 2022. Johnson previously appeared in Home and Away in 2010 as Paulie Rosetta. He acknowledged his history of having multiple characters on television shows, saying "I did two characters on Rake and two characters on All Saints. This is my second character on Home and Away and it is a lot of fun." PK is a wealthy poker player who buys his way into poker events hosted by Mackenzie Booth (Emily Weir). Johnson described PK as "a bit of a sociopath" and explained "He sees an opportunity to come in and cause some chaos and that's the thrill of it for him. These people are like playthings to him and I think he just goes from place to place and screws people over." 

Johnson relished the chance to play a character who was the opposite to the sensitive, moralistic Matt Knight, who he played in Doctor Doctor. He wanted to push himself in his career and found playing a villain was "exciting". Some viewers speculated that PK might be an undercover police officer and was going to bust the illegal gambling nights hosted by Mackenzie, but Johnson told Kerry Harvey of Stuff that while he could not confirm or deny the theory, he did not play the character that way. Harvey pointed out that it was ironic Johnson was playing a gambler, as he was not that kind of risk taker in real life. Johnson admitted that he refuses to do voiceover work for gambling commercials as it can ruin people's lives, and he thought the storyline with PK and Mackenzie showed "how no one ever really wins when it comes to gambling." A whodunnit storyline began on 23 May, after PK's body is discovered on the beach.

Nathan Silva (Ryan Panizza) introduces PK to Mackenzie Booth and he asks to buy into that night's poker game, but she says it is full and he would need to be vetted. Nathan tells her he can vouch for PK, but Mac turns them down. Nathan tries again to convince Mac to let PK into the game and PK tells her to name her price to get him a seat at the table, which she accepts. Felicity Newman (Jacqui Purvis) is suspicious of PK, but Mac insists that he stays as he tripled the buy-in. PK later tells Mac that he wants to run an exclusive poker night at Salt with one table and a $5,000 buy-in. When they discuss the arrangements, PK tells Mac that he does not want Felicity at the event because her brother is a police officer. Felicity confronts PK, telling him that she has been running poker nights for years and that her brother is not an issue, but PK dismisses her. He later sends Nathan to stop her from leaving her house on the night. PK wins big, but he then informs Mac that the House lost and she owes the players $100,000. PK says he has got Mac covered and that they can find a way for her to repay him. He gives her his hotel address and she realises that he wants her to have sex with him. Mac goes to his hotel room, where PK makes advances towards her. They kiss, but Mac soon tells him that she cannot go through with it. 

Mac soon learns that PK has scammed her, as the House cannot lose. She later invites PK to Salt, where she pitches him an idea to repay her debt – they will hose another VIP poker night and she will give him the buy-in takings. However, PK says that he will run the night and then demands all of the money made, causing an angered Mac to ask him to leave. He later sends some men to Salt to steal the takings and trash the restaurant. Tane Parata (Ethan Browne) is stabbed during a fight with them. Mac confronts PK and tells him that she knows he conned her and that Tane could have died. Nathan assures her that nobody was meant to get hurt and the men were sent to intimidate her. Dean Thompson (Patrick O'Conner) threatens PK, who retaliates by sending Dean a photo of his young son with a threatening message. Dean attacks PK at the Surf Club and has to be pulled away. He later arranges for the River Boys to kidnap PK. Days later, PK's body is found on the beach and the police conclude that it was dumped there. The coroner reports that PK died from multiple blunt force trauma to the head. All those involved with PK are questioned, and Nathan later retrieves a metal wrench from the bushes and wipes PK's blood off of it. He then tries to frame Dean for PK's murder, but Dean has him kidnapped and then forces him to go to the police, where he confesses to killing PK to protect Mac.

Bob Forsyth
Bob Forsyth, played by Rob Mallet, made his first appearance on 4 July 2022. The character and casting details were announced on 29 June 2022. Bob is one of four characters who make up the fictional band Lyrik, who have been introduced following the departure of four cast members in 2022. Mallet said that joining the cast of Home and Away had been on his "bucket list". He also stated "The whole team there are a pleasure to work with and experts at what they do. It's no wonder the show still has as much support as it does." Sam Warner of Digital Spy reported that Bob has some "big plans" for Lyrik and he is not sure that Summer Bay deserves their music. He is also in a "rocky relationship" with fellow band member Kirby Aramoana (Angelina Thomson). Mallet later said that his character "wants it all; fame, glory, and artistic integrity." Bob departs two weeks after Lyrik's introduction, having grown tired of playing pub gigs in small towns. He tries to persuade Kirby to form a band with him, before quitting Lyrik and driving out of the Bay.

Kirby Aramoana
Kirby Aramoana, played by Angelina Thomson, made her first appearance on 4 July 2022. The character and casting details were announced on 29 June 2022. Kirby is one of four characters who make up the fictional band Lyrik, who have been introduced following the departure of four cast members in 2022. Thomson said the actors who make up the band had formed a close bond as they all joined the show together. She found that her background in music helped her to portray Kirby. Thomson compared her character to the ocean, saying she is "wild, passionate, playful, creative, effervescent and simultaneously calm and loving." Kirby is in a "rocky relationship" with fellow band member Bob Forsyth (Rob Mallet). After Bob leaves the band, Lyrik find a new lead singer in Theo Poulos (Matt Evans). Thomson described the search as "stressful" for Lyrik's remaining members, but said they were "taken aback" when Theo turned up. Theo also becomes a love interest for Kirby, after the pair spend the night bonding and writing together. Thomson commented: "Kirby and Theo's mutual passion for music is a deep connection." After they write a new song, Theo and Kirby celebrate with a hug, which soon leads to them kissing.

Remi Carter
Remi Carter, played by Adam Rowland, made his first appearance on 4 July 2022. The character and casting details were announced on 29 June 2022. Remi is one of four characters who make up the fictional band Lyrik, who have been introduced following the departure of four cast members in 2022. Rowland was working in a bar when he learned he had been cast as Remi. He explained "I was pouring pints when my phone rang with the news. Needless to say I needed a pint or two myself after that phone call. I was excited and slightly daunted by the fact that my life was about to change." Three days later, Rowland relocated to Sydney where the show is filmed. He called his character "the quintessential Australian larrikin", and said Remi "enjoys a good time and stirring the pot but is loyal to his friends and family." Remi is best friends with fellow band member Eden Fowler (Stephanie Panozzo) and they enjoy teasing each other.

Eden Fowler
Eden Fowler, played by Stephanie Panozzo, made her first appearance on 4 July 2022. The character and casting details were announced on 29 June 2022. Eden is one of four characters who make up the fictional band Lyrik, who have been introduced following the departure of four cast members in 2022. Panozzo was unable to attend her audition for the role in person after she contracted COVID-19, so she had to audition over a Zoom call with the casting producers. Of her casting, she said "My agents FaceTimed me, which they never do, and they said I booked the role. I was absolutely blown away and beyond excited. It was a very surreal and incredible feeling." Panozzo my name is mirabell  casting "feels like a dream come true." She described her character as "a wild child, full of fire and fun. She is fiercely loyal, speaks her mind and her greatest loves are music and her friends and family." Eden is best friends with fellow band member Remi Carter (Adam Rowland) and they like to tease each other. Writers established a connection between Eden and Cash Newman (Nicholas Cartwright), as it emerges that they dated before their arrivals in Summer Bay.

Bree Cameron

Bree Cameron, played by Juliet Godwin, made her first appearance on 9 August 2022. Godwin had been pictured filming her first scenes at the show's outdoor location of Palm Beach in March 2022. The character and Godwin's casting was officially confirmed on 19 July 2022. Godwin admitted that winning a role on Home and Away was "a dream come true". She told Stephanie McKenna of PerthNow: The fact that I'm able to wake up and go to set every day and do what I love is such a gift. I'm really grateful for this opportunity. Everyone there is so lovely. I get to work with really talented actors, and it's always a fun vibe." She learned she had secured the role of Bree while she was in her bedroom putting on a face mask for a night in, adding "My agent called me and I literally did a happy dance." 

Bree is Summer Bay's newest doctor, who takes over running the local hospital's emergency department, following the departure of Logan Bennett (Harley Bonner). Godwin said her character is "ready for a fresh start" and finds the Bay to be the perfect place to do that. Justin Harp of Digital Spy said Bree was billed as "laid-back, kind and caring", but she is hiding something beneath her "bubbly demeanour". Godwin also described her as having a "heart of gold" and being "a surfer chick". As Bree settles into the Bay, her past and secrets are slowly revealed to the other residents. The character's first episode saw her treating Constable Cash Newman (Nicholas Cartwright) after he was shot while on duty.

Heather Frazer

Heather Frazer, played by Sofia Nolan, made her first appearance on 24 August 2022. Nolan's agent secured the audition for her and she found the character brief "enticing", as she learned of Heather's "vivacious nature" and her storyline. She was informed that she had been cast two weeks after the audition. Nolan told Tamara Cullen of TV Week that it was "a wonderful surprise." Heather comes to Summer Bay to get help from Roo Stewart (Georgie Parker) with a law school application, but causes suspicion when she takes a photo of Marilyn Chambers (Emily Symons). Nolan described Heather as being "a force to be reckoned with". She thought that because of Heather's "unfortunate" upbringing, her confidence and spirit was "admirable." Nolan added "She has a passion for family law, and wants to help others who have experienced that struggle." It later emerges that Heather is Marilyn's daughter, and that Marilyn gave her up for adoption.

Heather meets with her new tutor Roo Stewart at the Pier Diner to work on a TAFE application form. She tells Roo that she wants to study law in order to help those who normally would not have the means, like mothers who have been separated from their children. Heather then explains that while she worked as a housekeeper, she had an affair with a married man and became pregnant. The couple she worked for then took the baby to raise as their own. Roo says she knows what it is like to lose contact with a child. Heather reacts when she hears Roo call out to Marilyn Chambers, and she later takes a photo of Marilyn on her phone.

Later, Heather kidnaps Marilyn, Alf, Irene, and Roo and holds them hostage in her former boarding school. There, she forces Marilyn to admit to the others that Heather is her daughter who she gave up for adoption, after an affair with a man she worked for. Heather reveals her plan to get revenge on Marilyn for doing so, as her parents turned out to be less than caring towards her. However, Constables Cash Newman (Nicholas Cartwright) and Rose Delaney (Kirsty Marillier) arrive, having discovered that Heather killed her stepmother. Heather grabs Marilyn and forces her up to the roof, where she is confronted by Cash. He tries to talk her down, but Heather pulls Marilyn up onto the ledge of a balcony and attempts to reach an open window. The masonry crumbles and Heather falls to the floor below, but she is not killed. As a handcuffed Heather recovers at the hospital, Marilyn apologises to Heather for being the reason she is in so much pain, but, knowing that Heather is about to face imprisonment for her crimes, tells her that she cannot give her the help she needs or be part of her life, severing ties with her once more. Marilyn leaves as an enraged Heather flies into a rant, yelling that her friends know the truth and will never look at her the same way again. Marilyn later receives word that Heather is unfit to stand trial for her crimes and is committed to a psychiatric hospital.

Others

References

External links
Characters and cast at 7plus

, 2022
2022 in Australian television
, Home and Away